In neuroanatomy, the postcentral gyrus is a prominent gyrus in the lateral parietal lobe of the human brain. It is the location of the primary somatosensory cortex, the main sensory receptive area for the sense of touch. Like other sensory areas, there is a map of sensory space in this location, called the sensory homunculus.

The primary somatosensory cortex was initially defined from surface stimulation studies of Wilder Penfield, and parallel surface potential studies of Bard, Woolsey, and Marshall. Although initially defined to be roughly the same as Brodmann areas 3, 1 and 2, more recent work by Kaas has suggested that for homogeny with other sensory fields only area 3 should be referred to as "primary somatosensory cortex", as it receives the bulk of the thalamocortical projections from the sensory input fields.

Structure
The lateral postcentral gyrus is bounded by:
medial longitudinal fissure medially (to the middle)
central sulcus rostrally (in front)
postcentral sulcus caudally (in back)
lateral sulcus inferiorly (underneath)

The postcentral gyrus includes Brodmann areas 1, 2, and 3. Brodmann area 1 occupies the apex of the postcentral gyrus.

See also
 List of regions in the human brain

Additional images

External links

  - area 1
  - area 2
  - area 3

01
Somatosensory system
Gyri
Parietal lobe